KGIC-LP (105.5 FM) is a radio station licensed to Corona, California, United States, the station serves the Riverside-San Bernardino area. The format is Spanish language Adult Contemporary with some Christian religious programming. The station is currently owned by Andres Serrano Ministries.

References

External links
 

GIC-LP
GIC-LP
Mass media in Corona, California
Mass media in Riverside County, California
Mass media in San Bernardino County, California